The following lists events that happened during 2015 in Finland.

Incumbents
 President: Sauli Niinistö
 Prime Minister: Alexander Stubb (until 29 May), Juha Sipilä (from 29 May)
 Speaker: Eero Heinäluoma (until 21 April), Juha Sipilä (from 28 April), (until 29 May), Maria Lohela (from 29 May)

Events
19 April – 2015 Finnish parliamentary election was held. As the leader of the largest party, Juha Sipilä of Centre was tasked with forming the new government coalition.
29 May – Coalition negotiations ware completed, leading to the formation of the Sipilä cabinet.

Deaths
3 January – Jouko Törmänen, 60, ski jumper, Olympic champion (1980)
8 February 
Rauni-Leena Luukanen-Kilde, 75, parapsychologist
Oscar Stenström, 36, racing cyclist
29 June – Rabbe Grönblom, 65, restaurant owner and entrepreneur
2 September – Simo Salminen, 82, comedic actor

References

External links
 

 
2010s in Finland
Finland
Finland
Years of the 21st century in Finland